Idaho City High School is located in the rural mountain community of Idaho City, Idaho.  The high school is built on top of one of the richest gold deposits in the U.S. and was the center of the largest town in the Northwest in 1864 with a population of 7,000.  In 1863 the town, formerly known as Bannock, had a printing office, eight bakeries, forty to fifty variety stores, fifteen to twenty doctors, twenty five to thirty five attorneys, seven blacksmith shops, four sawmills, two dentists, three express offices, five auctioneers, three drugstores, four butcher shops, three billiard tables, two bowling alleys, three stables, four breweries, one harness shop, one mattress factory, two jewelers, and a dozen other assorted businesses according to The Sacramento Daily Union.  Today the town is much smaller with a population of around 465.
Idaho City High School is a high school in Idaho City in Boise County, Idaho. The school colors are navy and gold and the mascot is the wildcat.

Clubs
 Associated Student Body (ASB)
 National Honor Society (NHS)
 Wildcat Pride

Sports
 Football
 Volleyball
 Boys Basketball (Varsity and JV)
 Girls Basketball (Varsity and JV)
 Cross Country
 Track & Field
 Cheerleading

References

External links
Idaho City H.S./M.S.
Idaho City Schools

Public high schools in Idaho
Schools in Boise County, Idaho
1995 establishments in Idaho